For 1984 in television, see:

1984 in Albanian television
1984 in American television
1984 in Australian television
1984 in Austrian television
1984 in Belgian television
1984 in Brazilian television
1984 in British television
1984 in Canadian television
1984 in Croatian television
1984 in Czech television
1984 in Danish television
1984 in Dutch television
1984 in Estonian television
1984 in French television
1984 in German television
1984 in Indonesian television
1984 in Irish television
1984 in Israeli television
1984 in Japanese television
1984 in New Zealand television
1984 in Norwegian television
1984 in Philippine television
1984 in Portuguese television
1984 in Scottish television
1984 in Singapore television
1984 in South African television
1984 in Swedish television
1984 in television